Chandranigahpur Solar Project is a 4 MW solar station located at Rautahat District, Province No. 2; Nepal.  The plant is owned and run by Api Power Company Pvt. Ltd., an IPP. The plant came in operation in February 2021.

See also
List of power stations in Nepal
Butwal Solar PV Project
Nuwakot Solar Power Station

References

Energy in Nepal
Renewable energy in Nepal
Solar power in Nepal
Solar power stations in Nepal
Electric power in Nepal